Roberto Jesús Álvarez Ríos (born September 17, 1932, in Havana, Cuba, died December 16, 2015, in Saint-Benoît, Réunion - Álvarez-Ríos according to death notice in Le Monde) was a Cuban artist specializing in painting and drawing.

Between 1951 and 1955, Alvarez studied at the Escuela Nacional de Bellas Artes "San Alejandro" in Havana. In 1958, he studied drawing and painting in the École nationale supérieure des Beaux-Arts in Paris, France.

Individual exhibitions
 1962 - "Roberto Álvarez Ríos" Galería de Arte, Galiano y Concordia, Havana, Cuba
 2002 - "Roberto Álvarez Ríos. Exposition de Peintures". Galerie Foch, Rodez, France.
 2003 - Galerie du Vieux Chateau, Saint-Jean le Thomas, France
 2004 - Galerie Hang Art, Paris, France
 2005 - Centre Culturel "Le Triangle", Huningue, France

Collective exhibitions
1955 - " XXXVI Salón de Bellas Artes", National Museum of Fine Arts of Havana
1959 - "Ière. Biennale de París", Musée d'Art Moderne de la Ville de Paris, France
1994 - "Petits Formats", Espace Altura, Paris, France.

References
 Jose Veigas-Zamora, Cristina Vives Gutierrez, Adolfo V. Nodal, Valia Garzon, Dannys Montes de Oca; Memoria: Cuban Art of the 20th Century; (California/International Arts Foundation 2001); 
 Jose Viegas; Memoria: Artes Visuales Cubanas Del Siglo Xx; (California Intl Arts 2004);

External links
 Official site of Roberto Alvarez-Rios
 Cuban Foreign Ministry Press Release
 Professional Association of the Communist Party of Madrid
 World Data Research Center article
 Radio Habana Cuba article
 Cuban Foreign Ministry Press Release

1932 births
Cuban painters
Modern painters
Cuban contemporary artists
2015 deaths